Flinders Street, named after explorer Matthew Flinders, may refer to:
Flinders Street, Adelaide
Flinders Street, Melbourne
Flinders Street railway station, in Melbourne
Flinders Street Viaduct, a railway bridge in Melbourne

See also
Flinders (disambiguation)